In Greek mythology, Eurypyle (Ancient Greek: Εὐρυπύλη) may refer to the following personages:
 Eurypyle, an Amazon queen.
 Eurypyle, another name for Eurycyda.
 Eurypyle, a Thespian princess as one of the 50 daughters of King Thespius and Megamede or by one of his many wives. When Heracles hunted and ultimately slayed the Cithaeronian lion, Eurypyle with her other sisters, except for one, all laid with the hero in a night, a week or for 50 days as what their father strongly desired it to be. Eurypyle bore Heracles a son, Archedicus.
 Eurypyle, a maenad.

Notes

References 

 Apollodorus, The Library with an English Translation by Sir James George Frazer, F.B.A., F.R.S. in 2 Volumes, Cambridge, MA, Harvard University Press; London, William Heinemann Ltd. 1921. . Online version at the Perseus Digital Library. Greek text available from the same website

 Athenaeus of Naucratis, The Deipnosophists or Banquet of the Learned. London. Henry G. Bohn, York Street, Covent Garden. 1854. Online version at the Perseus Digital Library.
 Athenaeus of Naucratis, Deipnosophistae. Kaibel. In Aedibus B.G. Teubneri. Lipsiae. 1887. Greek text available at the Perseus Digital Library.
 Conon, Fifty Narrations, surviving as one-paragraph summaries in the Bibliotheca (Library) of Photius, Patriarch of Constantinople translated from the Greek by Brady Kiesling. Online version at the Topos Text Project.
 Diodorus Siculus, The Library of History translated by Charles Henry Oldfather. Twelve volumes. Loeb Classical Library. Cambridge, Massachusetts: Harvard University Press; London: William Heinemann, Ltd. 1989. Vol. 3. Books 4.59–8. Online version at Bill Thayer's Web Site
 Diodorus Siculus, Bibliotheca Historica. Vol 1-2. Immanel Bekker. Ludwig Dindorf. Friedrich Vogel. in aedibus B. G. Teubneri. Leipzig. 1888-1890. Greek text available at the Perseus Digital Library.

Nonnus of Panopolis, Dionysiaca translated by William Henry Denham Rouse (1863-1950), from the Loeb Classical Library, Cambridge, MA, Harvard University Press, 1940.  Online version at the Topos Text Project.
 Nonnus of Panopolis, Dionysiaca. 3 Vols. W.H.D. Rouse. Cambridge, MA., Harvard University Press; London, William Heinemann, Ltd. 1940-1942. Greek text available at the Perseus Digital Library.

 Pausanias, Description of Greece with an English Translation by W.H.S. Jones, Litt.D., and H.A. Ormerod, M.A., in 4 Volumes. Cambridge, MA, Harvard University Press; London, William Heinemann Ltd. 1918. . Online version at the Perseus Digital Library
 Pausanias, Graeciae Descriptio. 3 vols. Leipzig, Teubner. 1903.  Greek text available at the Perseus Digital Library.
 Tzetzes, John, Book of Histories, Book II-IV translated by Gary Berkowitz from the original Greek of T. Kiessling's edition of 1826. Online version at theio.com

Princesses in Greek mythology
Women of Heracles